The 2012–13 Hong Kong First Division League, also known as 2012–13 Red MR Hong Kong First Division League for sponsorship reasons, was the 101st since its establishment.

Kitchee were the defending champions, won their 5th Hong Kong title in the previous season. The season featured 8 teams from the 2011–12 Hong Kong First Division League and two new teams promoted from 2011–12 Hong Kong Second Division League: Kam Fung, which then renamed as Biu Chun Rangers, and Southern District who replace relegated Sham Shui Po and Hong Kong Sapling.

Teams 
A total of 10 teams contested the league, including eight sides from the 2011–12 season and two promoted from the 2011–12 Hong Kong Second Division League.

Stadia and locations 
Note: Table lists in alphabetical order.

1 Renamed Biu Chun Rangers, previously known as Kam Fung.
2 The capacity of Tseung Kwan O Sports Ground can be increased to 5,000 if the temporary stand is opened.
3 After successfully gaining the right to play in the 2012–13 Hong Kong First Division League on 8 April 2012, Southern plan to continue using Aberdeen Sports Ground as their home ground in the First Division League.
4 The capacity of Aberdeen Sports Ground is originally 9,000, but only the 4,000-seated main stand is opened for football match.
5 Renamed as Sun Pegasus, previously known as TSW Pegasus.
6 Renamed as Yokohama FC Hong Kong, previously known as Biu Chun Rangers.

Personnel and kits

Managerial changes

Foreign players
The number of foreign players was restricted to six per team.

League table

Positions by round

Results table

Fixtures and results

Round 1

Round 2

Round 3

Round 4

Round 5

Round 6

Round 7

Round 8

Round 9

Round 10

Round 11

Round 12

Round 13

Round 14

Round 15

Round 16

Round 17

Round 18

Remarks:
1 The capacity of Aberdeen Sports Ground is originally 9,000, but only the 4,000-seated main stand is opened for football match.
2 Yokohama FC Hong Kong's home matches against Kitchee and South China are played at Mong Kok Stadium instead of their usual home ground Siu Sai Wan Sports Ground.
3 Biu Chun Rangers's home matches against South China and Kitchee are played at Mong Kok Stadium instead of their usual home ground Sham Shui Po Sports Ground.
4 South China's home matches against Biu Chun Rangers will be played at Mong Kok Stadium instead of their usual home ground Hong Kong Stadium.
5 The match was abandoned after 28 minutes due to adverse weather and bad pitch conditions.
6 Since the 3,500-seated main stand was all full, the 1,500 temporary stand was opened and therefore the capacity of Tseung Kwan O Sports Ground was 5,000 in the home match against South China.

Season play-offs

The play-off semi-finals were played in one match each, contested by the teams who finished in 2nd and 3rd in the 2012–13 Hong Kong First Division League table,  the champions of Senior Challenge Shield and the winners of FA Cup. The winners of the semi-finals went through to the finals, with the winner of the final gaining 2014 AFC Cup participation.

Season statistics

Top scorers

Hat-tricks

 5 Player scored 5 goals in the match.

Scoring
 First goal of the season: Ng Wai Chiu for Sun Pegasus against Wofoo Tai Po (31 August 2012)
 Fastest goal of the season: 0 minute and 50 seconds, Ng Wai Chiu for Sun Pegasus against Wofoo Tai Po (31 August 2012)
 Widest winning margin: 6 goals
 Biu Chun Rangers 2–8 Sun Pegasus (Week 18, 4 May 2013)
 Highest scoring game: 10 goals
 Citizen 7–3 Wofoo Tai Po (Week 8, 11 November 2012)
 Biu Chun Rangers 2–8 Sun Pegasus (Week 18, 4 May 2013)

Discipline
 Most yellow cards (player): 7
 Eugene Mbome (Sun Pegasus)
 Mauricio Correa Da Luz (Tuen Mun)
 Most yellow cards in a match (club): 6
 South China (Week 4, South China 1–0 Kitchee)
 Most yellow cards in total (club): 46
 Sun Pegasus
 Most red cards in a match (club): 2
 Sunray Cave JC Sun Hei (Week 4, Sunray Cave JC Sun Hei 2–2 Biu Chun Rangers)
 Yokohama FC Hong Kong (Week 5, Yokohama FC Hong Kong 1–4 Kitchee)
 Most red cards in total (club): 5
 Yokohama FC Hong Kong

Clean Sheets
 Most clean sheets: 5
 South China
 Citizen
 Fewest clean sheets: 0
Biu Chun Rangers
 Wofoo Tai Po

Awards

Monthly awards
The monthly awards are organised by the Hong Kong Sports Press Association. 20 journalists who specialise in football in Hong Kong will vote their best player of the month. Player with the highest number of votes wins the award.

References 

Hong Kong First Division League seasons
1
Hong Kong